Fannrem is a village in the municipality of Orkland in Trøndelag county, Norway.

Due to recent conurbation between Orkanger and Fannrem, Statistics Norway regards Orkanger-Fannrem as one  community with a population (2018) of 8,204. Orkanger-Fannrem is one of the largest settlements in Trøndelag county.

Fannrem was the administrative centre of the old Orkdal municipality until 1 January 1963, when the municipalities of Orkanger, Orkland, and Geitastrand were merged into a new Orkdal municipality. At that time Orkanger became the municipal center.

The main city center of Fannrem is mainly composed of service industries, surrounded by residential areas and farms. The large Orkel industrial factory is located in Fannrem, which produces machinery for agricultural use. Norgesfôr Orkla, the main grain mill and silo for the Orkdalen region is located in Fannrem. Orkdal Church is located in Fannrem.

Notable residents
Ski jumper Roar Ljøkelsøy
Association football coaches Nils Arne Eggen and Knut Torbjørn Eggen
Parliamentarian Jorodd Asphjell

References

Orkland
Villages in Trøndelag